Alvaro Guardia (born 18 October 1954) is a Costa Rican sports shooter. He competed at the 1980 Summer Olympics and the 1992 Summer Olympics.

References

1954 births
Living people
Costa Rican male sport shooters
Olympic shooters of Costa Rica
Shooters at the 1980 Summer Olympics
Shooters at the 1992 Summer Olympics
Shooters at the 1991 Pan American Games
Sportspeople from San José, Costa Rica
Skeet shooters
20th-century Costa Rican people